Jonas Abbott Hughston (1808 – November 10, 1862) was a U.S. Representative from New York.

Born in Sidney, New York, Hughston completed preparatory studies.
He studied law.
He was admitted to the bar in 1839 and commenced practice at Delhi, New York.
He served as district attorney of Delaware County 1842–1845.
He resumed the practice of law.

Hughston was elected as an Opposition Party candidate to the Thirty-fourth Congress (March 4, 1855 – March 3, 1857).
He was appointed by President Lincoln marshal of the consular court at Shanghai, China, on March 26, 1862, and served until his death in Shanghai, China, on November 10, 1862.
He was interred in Poo-ting Cemetery.

Sources

1808 births
1862 deaths
People from Sidney, New York
Opposition Party members of the United States House of Representatives from New York (state)
People from Delhi, New York
19th-century American politicians